Palisade National Forest was established by the U.S. Forest Service in Wyoming and Idaho on July 1, 1910, with , evenly divided between Wyoming and Idaho, from the southern portion of Targhee National Forest. On July 1, 1917 the entire forest was named "Targhee" and the "Palisade" name was discontinued.

References

External links
Forest History Society
Listing of the National Forests of the United States and Their Dates (from the Forest History Society website) Text from Davis, Richard C., ed. Encyclopedia of American Forest and Conservation History. New York: Macmillan Publishing Company for the Forest History Society, 1983. Vol. II, pp. 743-788.

Former National Forests of Wyoming
Former National Forests of Idaho